A living stump is created when a live tree is cut, burned, eaten, or infected, causing its cambium to die above the root system.

Living stumps are generally characterized as having a thin outer layer of living cells that surround a hollow central cavity. 

Living stumps can survive for several years by 
 using excess carbon reserves,
 transfer of nutrients from the roots of neighbouring trees, often aided by mycorrhiza  or
 root grafting to the root system of living trees.

Root grafting allows for carbon transfer from living trees to living stumps resulting in incremental cambium growth in the stump.

Stumps can grow a callus tissue over its cross section which prolongs longevity of the stump by protecting it from infection and insect damage. A living stump which is capable of producing sprouts or cuttings is known as a stool, and is used in the coppicing method of woodland management.

Common Examples 
 Pinus strobus (white pine)
 Castanea dentata (American chestnut)
 Tsuga spp. (hemlock)
 Pseudotsuga menziesii (Douglas-fir)
 Cedrus spp. (cedar)

References 

Trees
Forest ecology